Glenea vittulata is a species of beetle in the family Cerambycidae. It was described by Per Olof Christopher Aurivillius in 1920 and is known from Borneo.

References

vittulata
Beetles described in 1920